Esther Waters is a 1948 British drama film directed by Ian Dalrymple and Peter Proud and starring Kathleen Ryan, Dirk Bogarde (first credited film appearance), and Cyril Cusack. It is an adaptation of the 1894 novel Esther Waters by George Moore.

Plot
The film is set in London in 1875.

Esther (Kathleen Ryan) goes into domestic service as a maid, only to be seduced by sweet-talking footman William (Dirk Bogarde). When he abandons her, she must deal with not only pregnancy but also her mother's death. She struggles to survive with only herself for comfort and strength.

She is forced to put her child into care in order to keep her job.

Cast
 Kathleen Ryan as Esther Waters
 Dirk Bogarde as William Latch
 Cyril Cusack as Fred
 Ivor Barnard as John Randall
 Fay Compton as Mrs Barfield
 Margaret Diamond as Sarah
 George Hayes as Journeyman
 Morland Graham as Ketley
 Mary Clare as Mrs. Latch
 Pauline Jameson as Hospital Nurse
 Shelagh Fraser as Margaret
 Margaret Withers as Grover
 Julian D'Albie as Squire Barfield
 Nuna Davey as Matron
 Beryl Measor as Mrs. Spires
 Barbara Shaw as Mistress
 Archie Harradine as Singer
 Duncan Lewis as Butcher

Production
The movie was Dirk Bogarde's first film as a leading man, when he replaced Stewart Granger, who dropped out.

Critical reception
The Radio Times wrote:

"George Moore's source novel was strongly influenced by the naturalism of Emile Zola, but there is little of the earthiness of the original in this tawdry adaptation, which rapidly plunges between the two stools of heritage production and sensationalist melodrama. Dirk Bogarde is suitably scurrilous as a rascally footman, but the action slows fatally when he is off screen, with Kathleen Ryan in the title role facing all her trials (single motherhood, the workhouse and Bogarde's drinking) with sulkiness rather than dignity and determination. The horse-racing scenes are efficiently presented, but Ian Dalrymple and Peter Proud direct with heavy hands"
TV Guide called the film "A well-done but melancholy costume drama from the book by the Irish playwright and critic George Moore, a cofounder of the theatre group that led to the famous Abbey Theatre."

References

External links

1948 films
1948 drama films
Films directed by Ian Dalrymple
Films shot at Pinewood Studios
British drama films
Films based on Irish novels
Films produced by Ian Dalrymple
British black-and-white films
British historical films
1940s historical films
Films set in the 1870s
Films set in London
Films set in Sussex
1940s English-language films
1940s British films
Horse racing films